Edward Baber (1532–1578) was an English politician, barrister and judge; he was also a wealthy Somerset landowner.

He was a Member (MP) of the Parliament of England for Bath in the Parliament of 1571 and in that of 1572–1576.

He was the younger son of John Baber and Agnes Willet, of the prominent landowning family of Chew Magna, Somerset. He was educated at Lincoln's Inn and was called to the Bar. He became Recorder of Bath in about 1571 and Serjeant-at-law in 1577. His position as Recorder effectively entitled him to represent Bath in the House of Commons of England. During his relatively brief Parliamentary career, he seems to have been a diligent committee man, sitting mainly on those committees where legal expertise was desirable.

His legal practice was extremely lucrative and enabled him to become a substantial landowner in Somerset, buying the manors of Aldwick and Regilbury, Nempnett Thrubwell. He also bought a half-share of the family estate at Chew Magna from his elder brother. In addition, he owned houses in London and Bristol.

He married Katherine Leigh, daughter of Sir Thomas Leigh, Lord Mayor of London and Alice Barker. They had four sons, including Francis, the eldest son and heir, and three daughters, including Mary, who married firstly Sir Roger Wilbraham, Solicitor General for Ireland, and secondly Sir Thomas Delves, 1st Baronet.

Sir Edward Baber and his wife Katherine Leigh are entombed at Saint Andrews Episcopal Church in Chew Magna in Baber Chapel.

References

1532 births
1578 deaths
English MPs 1571
English MPs 1572–1583
Serjeants-at-law (England)
Members of Lincoln's Inn
Politicians from Somerset